Tofurky is the brand name of an American vegan turkey replacement (also known as a meat analogue, or, more specifically, tofurkey) made from a blend of wheat protein and organic tofu.

Tofurky® is a trademark of Turtle Island Foods, a company based in Hood River, Oregon, United States. Turtle Island has come to also use the brand name for most of its meatless products, such as deli slices, sausages, jerky, tempeh (its first product), burgers, and franks. All of the Tofurky products are fully vegan and approved by the Vegan Society, and most are kosher-certified by the Kosher Supervision of America. The product name is a portmanteau of "tofu" and "turkey" into a single word which sounds like a spoonerism of "faux turkey".

History
Seth Tibbott, having become a vegetarian while in college founded Turtle Island Foods in 1980. The original Tofurky roast was created in collaboration with a local Portland, Oregon natural foods company called The Higher Taste, owned by Hans and Rhonda Wrobel and the Tofurky brand was officially introduced in 1995.

Purchase
 
The Tofurky roast is found in health food grocery stores; however, availability is limited in some areas. Inside the box, it comes in the form of a small but dense roast, wrapped tightly in a disposable casing, and is something of a rounded loaf in shape. It comes stuffed with mushrooms, herbs, and wild rice. Though the roast can be purchased separately, it is also offered as part of a meal with cranberry-apple-potato dumplings, gravy, and "wishstix" made from Tofurky Jurky, a meatless jerky product. The Whole Foods store chain is a major seller of Tofurky products.

Tofurky is a popular meat alternative amongst many vegetarians, who avoid turkey for ethical and/or personal reasons. The product is free from turkey and other meat products. The Green Stars Project awarded Tofurky 5/5 green stars for overall social and environmental impact.

Nutrition and health

Nutritional information for equal servings of Tofurky and equivalent meat products is available online, allowing interested people to compare sodium, fat, cholesterol, and protein. The company does not use trans fat and the product has no cholesterol since it is 100% vegan.

Turtle Foods has indicated that it no longer uses certain controversial soy products and only uses non-GMO soybeans. The roast is vegan, which also means it is suitable for those with egg or milk allergies; but for those who suffer from allergies to the soy and/or wheat gluten used in most meat alternatives, Tofurky is not an option.

Preparation
The Tofurky is pre-stuffed and sealed at the ends to enclose the stuffing. It cooks in one hour and fifteen minutes if thawed or three hours and fifteen minutes if frozen. Because the product has a uniform texture, it slices easily. Tofurky is seitan and soy based and was created to have a texture similar to that of meat products; the vegetable-based turkey-like flavorings are intended to make it comparable to traditional Thanksgiving fare. In order to make the product as similar to flesh as they intended, its creators designed the roast so that it tears off at a forty-five degree angle with the grain.

See also

 Daiya
 List of meat substitutes
 Macrobiotic diet
 Nut roast, a typically home-made, nut based main dish
 Tofurkey, common name for some kinds of turkey alternatives served at holidays
 Veggie burger

References

External links
Turtle Island Foods website

Vegan cuisine
Meat substitutes
Food product brands
Kosher food
B Lab-certified corporations
Food and drink introduced in 1995